Dismorphia laja is a butterfly in the  family Pieridae. It is found in northern South America.

Adults are sexually dimorphic. Males are black with cream bands and mimic Heliconius wallacei, while females are orange, yellow and black, and mimic species of the "tiger-complex" Ithomiines.

Subspecies
The following subspecies are recognised:
Dismorphia laja laja (Surinam)
Dismorphia laja lysianax (Hewitson, [1860]) (Peru)
Dismorphia laja tapajona (Bates, 1861) (Brazil: Pará, Rondônia)
Dismorphia laja carthesis (Hewitson, 1869) (Ecuador, Guyana)
Dismorphia laja tricolor Grose-Smith & Kirby, 1897 (Colombia)
Dismorphia laja jurua Röber, 1924 (Brazil: Amazonas)
Dismorphia laja spectabilis Avinoff, 1926 (Bolivia)
Dismorphia laja koenigi Baumann & Reissinger, 1969 (Peru)
Dismorphia laja rosina Lamas, 2004 (Peru)

Gallery

References

Dismorphiinae
Butterflies described in 1779
Fauna of Brazil
Pieridae of South America